Trout Lake may refer to:

Canada 
 Trout Lake, Alberta, an unincorporated community
Trout Lake Aerodrome, an aerodrome near Trout Lake, Alberta
 Trout Lake (British Columbia), a lake in the West Kootenay region
 Trout Lake, British Columbia, a rural community and ghost town
 Sambaa K'e (lake), formerly Trout Lake, a lake in the Northwest Territories
 Sambaa K'e, formerly Trout Lake, the community on this lake
Trout Lake Water Aerodrome, an aerodrome near Trout Lake / Sambaa K'e in Northwest Territories 
 Trout Lake (Vancouver), British Columbia
Trout Lake (Annapolis County, Nova Scotia)
Trout Lake (Halifax Regional Municipality, Nova Scotia)
 Trout Lake (Ontario), bordering North Bay

United States
 Trout Lake (Colorado) near Telluride
 Trout Lake (Florida) on the border of Polk and Highlands Counties
 Trout Lake (Flathead County, Montana)
 Trout Lake in Ravalli County, Montana
 Trout Lake in Sweet Grass County, Montana
 Trout Lake (Arietta, Hamilton County, New York)
 Trout Lake (Morehouse, Hamilton County, New York), a lake of New York
 Trout Lake (Warren County, New York)
 Trout Lake (Pennsylvania)
 Trout Lake, Washington
Trout Lake Airport, an airport near Trout Lake, Washington
 Trout Lake (Wisconsin)
 Trout Lake (Wyoming), in Yellowstone National Park
 Trout Lake Township, Michigan
 Trout Lake Township, Itasca County, Minnesota

Other uses